Soltau is a town in the Lüneburg Heath in Lower Saxony, Germany.

Soltau may also refer to:
Soltau (Han) station, railway station of Soltau
Soltau (river), a river of Lower Saxony, Germany

People with the surname Soltau
Annegret Soltau (born 1946), German visual artist
Eleanor Soltau (1877–1962), English doctor 
Gordon Soltau (1925–2014), American football player
Mirko Soltau (born 1980), German former footballer
Wilfried Soltau (1912–1995), West German sprint canoer